Zuzana Moravčíková (born 30 December 1956) is a female Slovak former track and field athlete who competed in sprint and middle-distance events. She was a silver medallist at the European Athletics Indoor Championships in 1983 and won a global silver in national record time (3:20.32 minutes) with Czechoslovakia's women's 4 × 400 metres relay team at the 1983 World Championships in Athletics, alongside Tatána Kocembová, Milena Matějkovičová and Jarmila Kratochvílová. She was a double silver medallist at the 1984 Friendship Games, at which Olympic-boycotting nations competed.

Born in Nitra, Moravčíková trained under coach Milanu Burešovi, alongside fellow national runner Matějkovičová. She was a three-time national champion in the 800 m, winning the outdoor title in 1980 and indoor titles in 1982 and 1985. She held personal bests of 52.39 seconds for the 400 metres and 1:56.96 minutes for the 800 metres, both set in 1983.

International competitions

National titles
Czechoslovak Athletics Championships
800 m: 1980
Czechoslovak Indoor Athletics Championships
800 m: 1982, 1985

See also
List of World Championships in Athletics medalists (women)
List of European Athletics Indoor Championships medalists (women)

References

External links

Living people
1956 births
Sportspeople from Nitra
Czechoslovak female sprinters
Czechoslovak female middle-distance runners
Slovak female sprinters
Slovak female middle-distance runners
World Athletics Championships medalists
World Athletics Championships athletes for Czechoslovakia
Friendship Games medalists in athletics